Claudia Zambuto (March 23, 1885–?)  was an Italian film actress of the silent era.

Selected filmography
 Fedora (1913)
 La belva della mezzanotte (1913)
 The Princess of Bedford (1914)
 The Bandit of Port Avon (1914)
 The Danube Boatman (1914)
 When Knights Were Bold (1916)
 Maciste the Policeman (1918)

References

Bibliography
 Goble, Alan. The Complete Index to Literary Sources in Film. Walter de Gruyter, 1999.

External links

Year of birth unknown
Year of death unknown
Italian film actresses
Italian silent film actresses
20th-century Italian actresses